The Kabasalan Science and Technology High School (Mataas na Paaralang Pang-Agham at Panteknolohiya ng Kabasalan) is a Secondary Public Science High School system located in   Kabasalan, Zamboanga Sibugay, Philippines.  It is a DepEd-recognized science high school.

Science high schools in the Philippines
Schools in Zamboanga Sibugay